Blauvelt House is located in Harrington Park, Bergen County, New Jersey, United States. The house was added to the National Register of Historic Places on January 9, 1983.

Two other houses listed on the NRHP in Bergen County have similar names: the Blauvelt House at 54 Tappan Rd. in Norwood, and the Blauvelt-Demarest House at 230 Broadway in Hillsdale.

See also
National Register of Historic Places listings in Bergen County, New Jersey

References

Harrington Park, New Jersey
Houses on the National Register of Historic Places in New Jersey
Houses in Bergen County, New Jersey
National Register of Historic Places in Bergen County, New Jersey
New Jersey Register of Historic Places